Respublika may refer to:
 Respublika Party of Kyrgyzstan
 Respublika (Kazakh activist organisation), first known in 2019
 Respublika (Kazakh newspaper), created in 2000 and closed in 2012
 Respublika (Lithuanian newspaper), created in 1989
 Respublika (album), an album by the Ukrainians
 Republic, a type of subdivision in Russia

See also 

 Res publica
 Republic
 Rzeczpospolita